Salari is a community in the Gjirokastër County, southern Albania. At the 2015 local government reform it became part of the municipality Tepelenë.

Notable people
Selam Musai, People's Hero of Albania
Gramoz Ruçi, politician
Former ministers: Valentina Leskaj, Ethem Ruka, Luan Memushi, Elmaz Sherifi

References

Populated places in Tepelenë
Villages in Gjirokastër County